This is a list of singles that have peaked in the Top 10 of the Billboard Hot 100 during 1974.

Elton John scored five top ten hits during the year with "Goodbye Yellow Brick Road", "Bennie and the Jets", "Don't Let the Sun Go Down on Me", "The Bitch Is Back", and "Lucy in the Sky with Diamonds", the most among all other artists.

Top-ten singles

1973 peaks

1975 peaks

See also
 1974 in music
 List of Hot 100 number-one singles of 1974 (U.S.)
 Billboard Year-End Hot 100 singles of 1974

References

General sources

Joel Whitburn Presents the Billboard Hot 100 Charts: The Seventies
Additional information obtained can be verified within Billboard's online archive services and print editions of the magazine.

1974
United States Hot 100 Top 10